Big Apple Pizza is an Israeli pizza chain with 10 branches throughout Israel, founded in 1986.

History
Big Apple Pizza was founded in 1986 by Haim Kedem, in the Jerusalem mall, Dorot Rishonim.

Kedem had spent many years in New York City and upon moving to Israel decided to open a pizza shop to bring the piece of NYC with him. Kedem's pizza, in traditional NYC fashion was made with thin crust.

In 1996, Kedem expanded the business outside of Jerusalem for the first time, opening his first pizza shop in Eilat.

In 2000 Kedem died and left the business to his two sons, who still run the business.

In January 2023 there are 10 stores, down from 11 in February 2016.

Branches
The inside of all the Big Apple Pizza locations are set up to remind patrons of the NYC experience. The tables are set up as if to be a NYC café, with pictures of NYC all around. Additionally they have a large collection of American license plates on their walls.

, there were 11 branches of Big Apple Pizza:
 Jerusalem – Ben Yehuda
 Jerusalem – Jaffa Pedestrian Mall
 Jerusalem – Beit HaKerem
 Jerusalem – Katamon
 Jerusalem – Ramat Eshkol
 Jerusalem – Gilo
 Mevaseret Zion
 Beit Shemesh
 Gan Yavne
 Eilat
 Eilat – Ice Park

Kashrut
All of Big Apple Pizza's locations throughout Israel are kosher, including those in Eilat which is mostly secular.

The six Jerusalem locations are Rabbanut Yerushalayim Mehadrin.

In popular culture
In August 2014, Andrew Cuomo, the former Governor of New York, went to Israel to show support for the country during Operation Protective Edge. As part of his trip, Cuomo met with students from NY studying in Israel, at Big Apple Pizza.

See also

 Culture of Israel
 Israeli cuisine
 Economy of Israel
 List of pizza chains
 List of restaurants in Israel

References 

Restaurant chains in Israel
Restaurants established in 1986
1986 establishments in Israel
Pizza chains
Restaurants in Jerusalem